Beatmania IIDX 19: Lincle is the 19th installment of Beatmania IIDX series. The location test itself was announced on April 18, 2011. The location test was held first on Akihabara on April 20, 2011. Umeda's location test started on April 22, 2011, and both ended on April 25, 2011. Fukuoka and Nagoya had their location test started from April 28, 2011 until May 1, 2011. Kyoto and Sapporo's location test started on May 6, 2011 until May 8, 2011. It was released on September 15, 2011.

Gameplay
For more information about the gameplay of Beatmania IIDX in general, please refer to Beatmania IIDX#Gameplay.

Beatmania IIDX tasks the player with performing songs through a controller consisting of seven key buttons and a scratchable turntable. Hitting the notes with strong timing increases the score and groove gauge bar, allowing the player to finish the stage. Failing to do so depletes the gauge until it is empty, abruptly ending the song.

Beatmania IIDX 19: Lincle retains the basic gameplay, which is hitting notes that fall from the top of the screen using either keys or disc to be scratched in order to fill up the Groove Meter, which is considered passed if at the end of the stage the Groove Meter is on 80% or above. Backspin Scratch (spinning the disc from one direction and spinning it to the opposite direction on the end) and Charge Notes (holding keys until the end of the note) from Beatmania IIDX 17: Sirius also make a comeback.

New Features
In this installment, there are several features that are new in this release, the most notable being the introduction of Free Plus Mode, which is Free Mode for two players. There is also Hazard Mode which is Standard Mode with the Hazard (1 Poor or Miss will fail the stage) option being automatically on, and also Step Up Mode which replaces Story Mode from Beatmania IIDX 17: Sirius. There are also new options in the game, Ex Hard, which is a more difficult option of Hard and Sudden+ Type B, a new Sudden+, in which the lane cover height will automatically change when there is a BPM change.

Meanwhile, Song Previews from Dance Dance Revolution are presented in Beatmania IIDX Lincle; hovering over a song will automatically play the preview of the song before the background music is played back. There is also a new feature, Help Display. This can be accessed by holding the Vefx button to display help on the Mode Select and Music Select screens. In addition to this release, Paseli users can now purchase a new pass known as "DJ VIP Pass" that can be done before playing the first stage.

Unlocking System

Lincle Kingdom
Lincle Kingdom system had first appeared on September 28, 2011 via Standard Mode. Players can choose dungeons and were brought to the usual song selection screen. However, in-game, there would be animations of the player's Avatar in battle with monsters. Defeating them will result in earning several Dellar and experience points. Reaching some levels would unlock new songs (classified as Revivals, both from older installments or from console releases). By fulfilling certain requirements, boss songs may be played.

Lincle Link and APPEND TRAVEL
With the Lincle Link system, players are able to unlock several songs from jubeat and two new songs for both 
Beatmania IIDX and jubeat. Append Travel also unlocks a new song for both of them. This event also unlocked several accessories for the player's Avatar.
Lincle Link Phase 5 also unlocks several songs from Reflec Beat Limelight.

Lincle Princess and Stamp Collection
This unlocking system would unlock 3 new songs, with two of them taken from the ROOTS26 Vol.5 drama CD. This event also unlocked several new Avatars and accessories for the player's Avatar.

Music
beatmaniaIIDX 19: Lincle has over 60 new songs and several revivals from older installments and console releases. Hundreds of older songs also made appearances.

References

External links 
  
beatmaniaIIDX 19 Lincle article on RemyWiki.
beatmaniaIIDX 19: Lincle discussion thread on Zenius-i-vanisher.

Arcade video games
Arcade-only video games
Beatmania games
Japan-exclusive video games
Multiplayer and single-player video games
2011 video games
Video games developed in Japan